Hiroki Higuchi (樋口 寛規, born  April 16, 1992) is a Japanese football player who plays as a forward.

Club statistics
Updated to 23 February 2018.

References

External links
Profile at Fukushima United FC

1992 births
Living people
Association football people from Hyōgo Prefecture
Japanese footballers
J1 League players
J2 League players
J3 League players
Shimizu S-Pulse players
FC Gifu players
Shonan Bellmare players
SC Sagamihara players
Fukushima United FC players
Association football forwards